The 81st Academy Awards ceremony, presented by the Academy of Motion Picture Arts and Sciences (AMPAS), honored the best films of 2008 and took place on February 22, 2009, at the Kodak Theatre in Hollywood, Los Angeles beginning at 5:30 p.m. PST / 8:30 p.m. EST. During the ceremony, the Academy of Motion Picture Arts and Sciences presented Academy Awards (commonly referred to as Oscars) in 24 categories. The ceremony was televised in the United States by ABC, and was produced by Bill Condon and Laurence Mark and directed by Roger Goodman. Hugh Jackman hosted the show for the first time. Two weeks earlier in a ceremony at the Beverly Wilshire Hotel in Beverly Hills, California held on February 7, the Academy Awards for Technical Achievement were presented by host Jessica Biel.

Slumdog Millionaire won eight awards, including Best Picture. Other winners included The Curious Case of Benjamin Button with three awards, The Dark Knight and Milk with two, and Departures, The Duchess, La Maison en Petits Cubes, Man on Wire, The Reader, Smile Pinki, Toyland, Vicky Cristina Barcelona, and WALL-E with one. The telecast garnered almost 37 million viewers in the United States.

Winners and nominees

The nominees for the 81st Academy Awards were announced on January 22, 2009, at 5:38 p.m. PST (13:38 UTC) at the Samuel Goldwyn Theater in Beverly Hills, California, by Sid Ganis, president of the Academy, and the actor Forest Whitaker. The Curious Case of Benjamin Button received the most nominations with thirteen (the ninth film to garner that many nominations); Slumdog Millionaire came in second with ten.

The winners were announced during the awards ceremony on February 22, 2009. Slumdog Millionaire was the eleventh film to win Best Picture without any acting nominations. Sean Penn became the ninth person to win Best Lead Actor twice. Best Supporting Actor winner Heath Ledger became the second performer to win a posthumous acting Oscar. The first actor to receive this distinction was Peter Finch who posthumously won Best Actor for Network two months after his death in January 1977. With its six nominations, WALL-E tied with 1991's Beauty and the Beast as the most nominated animated film in Oscar history.

Awards

Winners are listed first, highlighted in boldface and indicated with a double dagger.

{| class=wikitable
| valign="top" width="50%" |

 Slumdog Millionaire – Christian Colson, producer The Curious Case of Benjamin Button  – Kathleen Kennedy, Frank Marshall and Ceán Chaffin, producers
 Frost/Nixon – Brian Grazer, Ron Howard and Eric Fellner, producers
 Milk – Dan Jinks and Bruce Cohen, producers
 The Reader – Anthony Minghella, Sydney Pollack, Donna Gigliotti and Redmond Morris, producers
| valign="top" width="50%" |

 Danny Boyle – Slumdog Millionaire
 David Fincher – The Curious Case of Benjamin Button
 Ron Howard – Frost/Nixon
 Gus Van Sant – Milk
 Stephen Daldry – The Reader
|-
| valign="top" |

 Sean Penn – Milk as Harvey Milk
 Richard Jenkins – The Visitor as Walter Vale
 Frank Langella – Frost/Nixon as Richard Nixon
 Brad Pitt – The Curious Case of Benjamin Button as Benjamin Button
 Mickey Rourke – The Wrestler as Randy "The Ram" Robinson
| valign="top" |

 Kate Winslet – The Reader as Hanna Schmitz
 Anne Hathaway – Rachel Getting Married as Kym Buchman
 Angelina Jolie – Changeling as Christine Collins
 Melissa Leo – Frozen River as Ray Eddy
 Meryl Streep – Doubt as Sister Aloysius Beauvier
|-
| valign="top" |

 Heath Ledger – The Dark Knight as The Joker (posthumous award)
 Josh Brolin – Milk as Dan White
 Robert Downey Jr. – Tropic Thunder as Kirk Lazarus
 Philip Seymour Hoffman – Doubt as Father Brendan Flynn
 Michael Shannon – Revolutionary Road as John Givings Jr.
| valign="top" |

 Penélope Cruz – Vicky Cristina Barcelona as María Elena
 Amy Adams – Doubt as Sister James
 Viola Davis – Doubt as Mrs. Miller
 Taraji P. Henson – The Curious Case of Benjamin Button as Queenie
 Marisa Tomei – The Wrestler as Cassidy/Pam
|-
| valign="top" |

 Milk – Dustin Lance Black
 Frozen River – Courtney Hunt
 Happy-Go-Lucky – Mike Leigh
 In Bruges – Martin McDonagh
 WALL-E – Andrew Stanton, Jim Reardon and Pete Docter
| valign="top" |

 Slumdog Millionaire – Simon Beaufoy;  The Curious Case of Benjamin Button – Eric Roth and Robin Swicord; 
 Doubt – John Patrick Shanley; 
 Frost/Nixon – Peter Morgan; 
 The Reader – David Hare; 
|-
| valign="top" |

 WALL-E – Andrew Stanton Bolt – Chris Williams and Byron Howard
 Kung Fu Panda – Mark Osborne and John Stevenson
| valign="top" |

 Departures (Japan) in Japanese – Yōjirō Takita The Baader Meinhof Complex (Germany) in German – Uli Edel
 The Class (France) in French – Laurent Cantet
 Revanche (Austria) in German – Götz Spielmann
 Waltz with Bashir (Israel) in Hebrew – Ari Folman
|-
| valign="top" |

 Man on Wire – James Marsh and Simon Chinn The Betrayal – Nerakhoon – Ellen Kuras and Thavisouk Phrasavath
 Encounters at the End of the World – Werner Herzog and Henry Kaiser
 The Garden – Scott Hamilton Kennedy
 Trouble the Water – Carl Deal and Tia Lessin
| valign="top" |

 Smile Pinki – Megan Mylan The Conscience of Nhem En – Steven Okazaki
 The Final Inch – Irene Taylor Brodsky and Tom Grant
 The Witness: From the Balcony of Room 306 – Adam Pertovsky and Margaret Hyde
|-
| valign="top" |

 Toyland (Spielzeugland) — Jochen Alexander Freydank Manon on the Asphalt — Elizabeth Marre and Olivier Pont
 New Boy (Ireland) — Steph Green and Tamara Anghie
 On the Line (Auf der Strecke) — Reto Caffi
 The Pig (Grisen) — Tivi Magnusson and Dorte Høgh
| valign="top" |

 La Maison en Petits Cubes – Kunio Katō Lavatory – Lovestory – Konstantin Bronzit
 Oktapodi – Emud Mokhberi and Thierry Marchand
 Presto – Doug Sweetland
 This Way Up – Alan Smith and Adam Foulkes
|-
| valign="top" |

 Slumdog Millionaire – A. R. Rahman The Curious Case of Benjamin Button – Alexandre Desplat
 Defiance – James Newton Howard
 Milk – Danny Elfman
 WALL-E – Thomas Newman
| valign="top" |

 "Jai Ho" from Slumdog Millionaire – Music by A. R. Rahman; Lyrics by Gulzar "Down to Earth" from WALL-E – Music by Peter Gabriel and Thomas Newman; Lyrics by Peter Gabriel
 "O Saya" from Slumdog Millionaire – Music and Lyrics by A. R. Rahman and M.I.A.
|-
| valign="top" |

 The Dark Knight – Richard King Iron Man – Frank Eulner and Christopher Boyes
 Slumdog Millionaire – Glenn Freemantle and Tom Sayers
 WALL-E – Ben Burtt and Matthew Wood
 Wanted – Wylie 
| valign="top" |

 Slumdog Millionaire – Resul Pookutty, Richard Pryke and Ian Tapp The Curious Case of Benjamin Button – David Parker, Michael Semanick, Ren Klyce and Mark Weingarten
 The Dark Knight – Lora Hirschberg, Gary Rizzo and Ed Novick
 WALL-E – Tom Myers, Michael Semanick and Ben Burtt
 Wanted – Chris Jenkins, Frank A. Montaño and Petr Forejt
|-
| valign="top" |

 The Curious Case of Benjamin Button – Art Direction: Donald Graham Burt; Set Decoration: Victor J. Zolfo Changeling – Art Direction: James J. Murakami; Set Decoration: Gary Fettis
 The Dark Knight – Art Direction: Nathan Crowley; Set Decoration: Peter Lando
 The Duchess – Art Direction: Michael Carlin; Set Decoration: Rebecca Alleway
 Revolutionary Road – Art Direction: Kristi Zea; Set Decoration: Debra Schutt
| valign="top" |

 Slumdog Millionaire – Anthony Dod Mantle Changeling – Tom Stern
 The Curious Case of Benjamin Button – Claudio Miranda
 The Dark Knight – Wally Pfister
 The Reader – Chris Menges and Roger Deakins
|-
| valign="top" |

 The Curious Case of Benjamin Button – Greg Cannom The Dark Knight – John Caglione Jr. and Conor O'Sullivan
 Hellboy II: The Golden Army – Mike Elizalde and Thomas Floutz
| valign="top" |

 The Duchess – Michael O'Connor Australia – Catherine Martin
 The Curious Case of Benjamin Button – Jacqueline West
 Milk – Danny Glicker
 Revolutionary Road – Albert Wolsky
|-
| valign="top" |

 Slumdog Millionaire – Chris Dickens The Curious Case of Benjamin Button – Kirk Baxter and Angus Wall
 The Dark Knight – Lee Smith
 Frost/Nixon – Mike Hill and Daniel P. Hanley
 Milk – Elliot Graham
| valign="top" |

 The Curious Case of Benjamin Button'' – Eric Barba, Steve Preeg, Burt Dalton and Craig Barron
 The Dark Knight – Nick Davis, Chris Corbould, Tim Webber and Paul Franklin
 Iron Man – John Nelson, Ben Snow, Dan Sudick and Shane Mahan
|}

Jean Hersholt Humanitarian Award
 Jerry Lewis

Films with multiple nominations and awards

The following 15 films received multiple nominations:

The following four films received multiple awards:

 Presenters and performers 
The following individuals presented awards or performed musical numbers.

Presenters

Performers

Ceremony information

Due to the declining viewership of the recent Academy Awards ceremonies, AMPAS had contracted an entirely new production team in an attempt to revive interest surrounding both the awards and festivities. In September 2008, the Academy selected producers Bill Condon and Laurence Mark to co-produce the telecast. Nearly three months later, actor Hugh Jackman, who had previously emceed three consecutive Tony Awards ceremonies between 2003 and 2005, was chosen as host of the 2009 gala. Jackman expressed his anticipation of the awards in the few days preceding, and had commented that he was thrilled with preparations for the ceremony.

Notable changes were introduced in the production of the telecast. In an attempt to build suspense and curiosity leading up to the awards, Condon and Mark announced that they would not reveal any of the presenters or performers who would participate in the Oscarcast. Another unique feature of the ceremony was that the orchestra performed onstage instead of being relegated to a pit. In a break from previous presentations, five previous Oscar-winning performers presented each of the acting categories as opposed to only one or two. In addition, the Academy announced that for the first time since Oscar began broadcasting on television, film studios would be able to televise advertisements promoting their upcoming films. Furthermore, a montage of upcoming 2009 films was shown over the ceremony's closing credits.

Several other people participated in the production of the ceremony. Chris Harrison hosted "Road to the Oscars", a weekly behind-the-scenes video blog on the Oscar ceremony website. David Rockwell designed a new set and stage design for the ceremony. Film historian and author Robert Osborne greeted guests entering the festivities at the Hollywood and Highland Center. Film director Judd Apatow filmed a comedy montage which featured Seth Rogen and James Franco reprising their roles from Pineapple Express. Director Baz Luhrmann produced a song and dance number saluting movie musicals.

Peter Gabriel, who was originally scheduled to perform his nominated song "Down to Earth" from WALL-E during the live broadcast, declined to perform after learning that he would be allowed to sing only 65 seconds of the song during the ceremony's Best Original Song nominee performances. Gabriel still attended the ceremony but singer John Legend, backed by the Soweto Gospel Choir, performed the song in place of Gabriel.

Box office performance of nominated films
Continuing a trend in recent years, the field of major nominees favored independent, low-budget films over blockbusters. However, one of the nominees for Best Picture had grossed over $100 million before the nominations were announced (compared with none from the previous year). The combined gross of the five Best Picture nominees when the Oscars were announced was $188 million with an average gross of $37.7 million per film.The Curious Case of Benjamin Button was the highest earner among the Best Picture nominees with $104.4 million in domestic box office receipts. The film was followed by Slumdog Millionaire ($44.7 million), Milk ($20.7 million), Frost/Nixon ($8.8 million), and finally The Reader ($8.3 million). Among the rest of the top 50 releases of 2008 in U.S. box office before the nominations, 33 nominations went to nine films on the list. Only The Dark Knight (1st), WALL-E (5th), Kung Fu Panda (6th), Bolt (19th), Tropic Thunder (20th), and The Curious Case of Benjamin Button (21st) were nominated for directing, acting, screenwriting, Best Picture or Animated Feature. The other top-50 box office hits that earned nominations were Iron Man (2nd), Wanted (16th), and Hellboy II: The Golden Army (41st).

Faked winners leak
Shortly after the voting polls were closed for the awards, a purported list of winners was posted online. The list, which bore a purported signature from Academy president Sid Ganis, stated that Mickey Rourke won for Best Actor, Kate Winslet won for Best Actress, Amy Adams won for Best Supporting Actress, Heath Ledger won for Best Supporting Actor, and Slumdog Millionaire won for Best Picture. AMPAS spokeswoman Leslie Unger later revealed that the list was "a complete fraud", and that PricewaterhouseCoopers had just begun to count the ballots.

Critical reviews
The show received a mixed reception from media publications. Some media outlets received the broadcast more positively. Television critic Robert Bianco of USA Today gave Jackman an average review but extolled producers Condon and Mark saying that the broadcast felt "faster and more intimate without sacrificing Hollywood glamour." Vanity Fair columnist Julian Sancton gave high marks for Jackman's hosting performance stating "After several years of glamour-deflating wisecracks from blasé hosts like Jon Stewart, Ellen DeGeneres, and Steve Martin, the new producers hired an M.C. who was willing to break a sweat." Film critic Roger Ebert lauded Jackman's performance noting that he "would be a charmer as host, and he was." Of the show itself, Ebert added, "It was the best Oscar show I've ever seen, and I've seen plenty."

Other media outlets were more critical of the show. Los Angeles Times columnist Mary McNamara was thought Jackman's performance "obliterated all memory" of David Letterman's hosting the ceremony in 1995, which was widely panned. Time television critic James Poniewozik wrote that Jackman was "charming and game and I bet he absolutely killed in the room. But he didn’t really project beyond the room, nor did he much seem to be trying to." He also noted that while there were some entertaining moments, "the broadcast overall had problems of pacing." Maureen Ryan of the Chicago Tribune remarked, "The whole thing was driven by a manic desire to bring some old-school glamor to the proceedings." She added that the long introductions praising the acting nominees slowed down the proceedings.

Ratings and reception
The American telecast on ABC drew in an average of 36.94 million people over its length, which was a 13% increase from the record lows of the previous year's ceremony. An estimated, 68.48 million total viewers watched all or part of the awards. The show also drew higher Nielsen ratings compared to the previous ceremony, with 20.88% of households watching over a 32.44 share. In addition, the program scored a 12.43 rating over a 30.61 share among the 18–49 demographic, which was a 13 percent increase.

In July 2009, the ceremony presentation received ten nominations at the 61st Primetime Emmys. Two months later, the ceremony won four awards including Outstanding Choreography (Rob Ashford), Outstanding Original Music and Lyrics (Hugh Jackman Opening Number: William Ross, John Kimbrough, Dan Harmon, Rob Schrab, Ben Schwartz), Outstanding Short Form Picture Editing, (Best Motion Picture Montage: Kyle Cooper, Hal Honigsberg), and Outstanding Sound Mixing for a Variety Or Music Series Or Special.

In Memoriam

The annual In Memoriam'' tribute was presented by actress Queen Latifah. She performed the song "I'll Be Seeing You" during the segment.

 Cyd Charisse – Actress
 Bernie Mac – Actor, comedian
 Bud Stone – Executive
 Ollie Johnston – Animator
 Van Johnson – Actor
 J. Paul Huntsman – Sound actor
 Michael Crichton – Writer, director
 Nina Foch – Actress
 Pat Hingle – Actor
 Harold Pinter – Writer
 Charles H. Joffe – Producer
 Kon Ichikawa – Director
 Charles H. Schneer – Producer
 Abby Mann – Screenwriter
 Roy Scheider – Actor
 David Watkin – Director of photography
 Robert Mulligan – Director
 Evelyn Keyes – Actress
 Richard Widmark – Actor
 Claude Berri – Director
 Maila Nurmi – Actress
 Isaac Hayes – Musician, actor
 Leonard Rosenman – Composer
 Ricardo Montalbán – Actor
 Manny Farber – Film critic
 Robert DoQui – Actor
 Jules Dassin – Director
 Paul Scofield – Actor
 John Michael Hayes – Screenwriter
 Warren Cowan – Publicist
 Joseph M. Caracciolo – Producer
 Stan Winston – Special effects
 Ned Tanen – Executive producer
 James Whitmore – Actor
 Charlton Heston – Actor
 Anthony Minghella – Director, producer
 Sydney Pollack – Director, producer
 Paul Newman – Actor

See also

 15th Screen Actors Guild Awards
 29th Golden Raspberry Awards
 51st Grammy Awards
 61st Primetime Emmy Awards
 62nd British Academy Film Awards
 63rd Tony Awards
 66th Golden Globe Awards
 List of submissions to the 81st Academy Awards for Best Foreign Language Film

Notes 
A:Following talks with his family in Australia, the Academy determined that Ledger's daughter, Matilda Rose Ledger, would own the award. However, due to Matilda's age, she will not gain full ownership of the statuette until her eighteenth birthday in 2023. Until that time, her mother, actress Michelle Williams, will hold the statuette in trust for Matilda. Ledger's family attended the ceremony. His parents and sister accepted the award on stage on his behalf.

References

External links

Official websites
 Academy Awards official website
 Academy of Motion Picture Arts and Sciences official website
 
  (run by the Academy of Motion Picture Arts and Sciences)

News resources
 The Oscars, 2009 BBC News
 CNN Awards Spotlight: Academy Awards
 The Envelope.com with contributions by Paul Sheehan
 Behind the times: the nominees for the 81st Annual Academy Awards World Socialist Web Site Arts Review

Analysis
 2008 Academy Awards Winners and History Filmsite
 Academy Awards, USA: 2009 Internet Movie Database

Other resources
 

Academy Awards ceremonies
2008 film awards
2009 in Los Angeles
2009 in American cinema
2009 awards in the United States
February 2009 events in the United States